Lord Suffield is the title given to the holders of the Suffield barony.

It could also refer to:
Lord Suffield (1816 ship), a merchant ship
Lord Suffield (apple), a variety of apple